The 2018 Chooks-To-Go PSL All-Filipino Conference was the fourth conference and third indoor tournament for the Philippine Super Liga's sixth season. The games began on October 30, 2018 at the Filoil Flying V Centre, San Juan.

Teams

Preliminary round

Team standings	

|}

Point system:
3 points = win match in 3 or 4 sets
2 points = win match in 5 sets
1 point  = lose match in 5 sets
0 point  = lose match in 3 or 4 sets

	
Match results
All times are in Philippines Standard Time (UTC+08:00)

|}

Second round
1st-8th ranking will be kept

Group A

|}

|}

Group B

	

|}

|}

Playoffs

Quarterfinals

|}

Semifinals
Twice-to-beat higher seed (*)

|}

Bronze match

|}

Finals
Best-of-three series 

|}

Final standing

Individual awards

Venues
Filoil Flying V Arena (main venue)
Mall of Asia Arena (semifinals and finals)

Broadcast partners
ESPN 5: The 5 Network, AksyonTV, Hyper (SD and HD), ESPN5.com

References

All-Filipino
PSL